The Alamo Ladies Classic was a golf tournament on the LPGA Tour from 1960 to 1973. It was played at several different courses in San Antonio, Texas.

Tournament locations

Winners
Alamo Ladies Classic
1973 Betsy Cullen

Alamo Ladies Open
1972 Kathy Whitworth

San Antonio Alamo Open
1971 Sandra Haynie

Alamo Ladies' Open
1968-70 No tournament
1967 Kathy Whitworth
1966 Sandra Haynie

Alamo Open
1965 Marlene Hagge

San Antonio Civitan Open
1964 Kathy Whitworth
1963 Kathy Whitworth

San Antonio Civitan
1962 Murle Lindstrom
1961 Louise Suggs
1960 Louise Suggs

References

Former LPGA Tour events
Golf in Texas
Sports competitions in San Antonio
Women's sports in Texas
Recurring sporting events established in 1960
Recurring sporting events disestablished in 1973
1960 establishments in Texas
1973 disestablishments in Texas